The 1990 World Figure Skating Championships were held at the Halifax Metro Centre in Halifax, Canada from  March 6 to 11. Medals were awarded in men's singles, ladies' singles, pair skating, and ice dancing.

Medal tables

Medalists

Medals by country

Results

Men

Ladies

Pairs

Ice dancing

 WD = Withdrew

References

External links
 results
  
  
  
  

World Figure Skating Championships
World Figure Skating Championships
Sport in Halifax, Nova Scotia
1990 in Nova Scotia
March 1990 sports events in Canada